Alexandre Troffa (born 6 May 2000) is a French footballer who plays as a midfielder for the B-team of AC Ajaccio in the Championnat National 3.

Professional career
Troffa spent two years in the academy of SC Bastia, but after the club's financial difficulties transferred to his hometown club Gazélec Ajaccio. He made his professional debut for Gazélec Ajaccio in a 2–0 Ligue 2 win over Nîmes Olympique on 23 January 2018.

In the summer 2020, Troffe moved to AC Ajaccio, where he was registered for the club's B-team in the Championnat National 3.

References

External links
 
 
 L'Equipe Profile

2000 births
Living people
Sportspeople from Ajaccio
Association football midfielders
French footballers
Gazélec Ajaccio players
AC Ajaccio players
Ligue 2 players
Championnat National players
Championnat National 3 players
Footballers from Corsica